Val-Racine is a municipality in Quebec, Canada.

References

External links

Municipalities in Quebec
Incorporated places in Estrie
Le Granit Regional County Municipality